Liqu is a town in Baota District, Yan'an, Shaanxi, China.

History 
After Liu Bobo established the Great Xia dynasty in 407 CE, he built the ancient city of Fenglin, which was located in present-day Zhoujiawan Village in Liqu. Fenglin's location, on a mountainous terrace north of the Yan River, made the city easy to defend. Song dynasty scientist Shen Kuo called the city as dense as a stone, and noted how difficult it would be to attack the city. The city was colloquially known as Helian City, after Liu Bobo's alternative name Helian Bobo. In 577 CE, Fenglin County was established, and was seated in the city of Fenglin. Song dynasty general Di Qing once renovated it. The county existed intermittently until 1072, when it was abolished by Emperor Shenzong of Song and demoted to a town. Today, the site of Fenglin is used as farmland.

In 1972 the people's communes of Liqu and Nianzhuang were established. In 1984, the people's communes were abolished, and Liqu was re-established as a town, and Nianzhuang was re-established as a township.

In 2001, Nianzhuang Township was merged into Liqu.

Geography 

The Yan River flows through the town.

Administrative divisions 
Liqu administers 2 residential communities and 24 administrative villages.

Residential communities 
The town's 2 residential communities are as follows:

 Jingqu Community
 Yangshan Community

Administrative villages 
The town's 24 administrative villages are as follows:

 Dongcun Village
 Xicun Village
 Zhoujiawan Village
 Chaiya Village
 Miaogou Village
 Gaomaowan Village
 Zhujiagou Village
 Yaliping Village
 Goumen Village
 Yangshan Village
 Zhangzhuang Village
 Zhongzhuang Village
 Lijiagou Village
 Wangzhuang Village
 Caojiagou Village
 Hujiapo Village
 Lijiagou Village
 Shagelao Village
 Nianzhuang Village
 Yangxingzhuang Village
 Liuzhuang Village
 Wangjiabian Village
 Shuangtian Village
 Zhangxingzhuang Village

Demographics 
According to the 2010 Chinese Census, Liqu has a population of 21,167.

A 2008 survey put the town's population at about 28,000 residents living in 5,360 households. Of this, 16,863 people lived in 4,110 agricultural households, 6,158 people lived in 1,328 non-agricultural households, and 4,979 or so people were found to be temporary residents.

The 2000 Chinese Census recorded a population of 17,343 in the town.

A 1996 estimate put Liqu's population at approximately 16,000. Nianzhuang Township, which would be merged into Liqu in 2001, had a population of about 5,000 in 1996, giving the combined area a total population of about 21,000.

Transportation 
The Shenmu–Yan'an railway passes through Liqu.  is located in the town.

National Highway 210 also passes through Liqu.

The region is now served by Yan'an Nanniwan Airport.

See also 

 Baota District
 China National Highway 210
 List of township-level divisions of Shaanxi
 Shenmu–Yan'an railway
 Towns of China
 Yan River
 Yan'an

References

Baota District
Township-level divisions of Shaanxi
Towns in China